Kapasiteettiyksikkö (Finnish for "capacity unit") was a Finnish hip hop group from Helsinki. The group was formed in 1997 by Anders "Andu" Westerholm, Markku "Tasis" Wettenranta and Dan "Uniikki" Tolppanen. Along with Fintelligens, Kapasiteettiyksikkö was one of the first Finnish-language hip hop groups that gained popularity in the country.

In 2003, together with Fintelligens members Elastinen and Iso H, Kapasiteettiyksikkö founded the record label Rähinä Records.

Discography

Albums 
 Päivästtoiseen (2001)
 Klassikko (2002)
 Itsenäisyyspäivä (2003)
 Usko parempaan (2004)
 Susijengi (2006)
 I ♥ KY (2008)

Singles

Music videos 
 "A-ay!" (2001)
 "Tää on mun Stadi" (2002)
 "Pakko saada sut" (2003)
 "Usko parempaan" (2004)
 "Niit on jokapuolel" (2004)
 "Erobiisi" (2006)
 "Vielä vähän aikaa" (2006)

References

External links 

 

Finnish hip hop groups
Musical groups established in 1997
Musical groups disestablished in 2008
Musical groups from Helsinki